The 1965–66 UC Irvine Anteaters men's basketball team represented the University of California, Irvine during the 1965–66 NCAA College Division men's basketball season. This was the program's first season competing in intercollegiate athletics. The Anteaters were led by first year head coach Danny Rogers and played their home games at Campus Hall. They finished their inaugural season 15–11.

Roster

Schedule

|-
!colspan=9 style=|Regular Season

Source

References

UC Irvine Anteaters men's basketball seasons
UC Irvine Anteaters
UC Irvine Anteaters